Järvenpää railway station is a railway station in Järvenpää about  north from Helsinki Central station. It was one of the first railway stations in Finland, which was established along the country's first railway line in 1862. Local lines D, R, T and few rush hour trains stops at the station.

In 1999 the station building was moved approximately  further away from the tracks.

The station has three platforms. Track 1 is for southbound trains, track 2 is for northbound non-stop-trains and the northbound local trains stops at platform 3. Tracks 2 and 3 form an island platform.

Next to the station is the Järvenpää taxi rank. Many local bus lines stop at the station.

External links 
 
 VR

References 

Railway station
Railway stations in Uusimaa
Railway stations opened in 1862
1862 establishments in Finland